John "Quack" Davis was a Negro league outfielder between 1908 and 1914.

Davis made his Negro leagues debut in 1908 with the Indianapolis ABCs. He played in four seasons for Indianapolis, and also spent time with the Leland Giants, Chicago Giants, and French Lick Plutos.

References

External links
  and Seamheads

Place of birth missing
Place of death missing
Year of birth missing
Year of death missing
Chicago Giants players
French Lick Plutos players
Indianapolis ABCs players
Leland Giants players
Baseball outfielders